Thliptoceras shafferi is a moth in the family Crambidae. It was described by Hans Bänziger in 1987. It is found in Guangdong and Guangxi in China and Chiang Mai in Thailand.

The wingspan is 23–26 mm. Adult males have been recorded sucking human perspiration.

Etymology
The species is named for Mr. M. Shaffer.

References

Moths described in 1987
Pyraustinae